Inés de Benigánim (9 February 1625 – 21 January 1696) - born as Josefa María Albiñana Gomar - was a Spanish Catholic professed religious of the Discalced Augustinian nuns with the religious name of "Josefa María of Saint Agnes". She became known for her profound spiritual and theological insight as well as for her severe austerities she practiced during her life.

Her beatification was celebrated in 1888 in Saint Peter's Basilica.

Life
Josefa María Albiñana Gomar was born  in Spain  in 1625 to poor parents, Lluís Albiñana and his wife Vicenta Gomar. Her father died when she was still a child. Following the death of her father, the family was aided   by  the town mayor, her uncle Bartomeu Tudela. As a child she suffered from epilepsy. She received the sacrament of  confirmation at the age of eight.

At the age of 13 or 14, having gone to the river to wash clothes, she reported having a vision of Jesus Christ who called her to embrace him and seek the religious life. This prompted her to refuse an offer of marriage, which so enraged her suitor that he killed himself.

She entered the Discalced Augustinian convent in her hometown on 25 October 1643 and assumed her religious name - that of "Josefa María of Saint Agnes - upon the profession of her vows and vesting in the habit on 26 June 1644; she made her solemn profession on 27 August 1645. She began to practice severe austerities that characterized her life and her time amongst her fellow religious. She also became known for prophetic gifts, which prompted people to consult her for her spiritual insights. She might have had a minimal formal education but it made up for her great understanding of theological topics. She could neither read nor follow the Latin Divine Office.

Gomar died in 1696 - on the feast of Saint Agnes - after having received the sacraments for the last time. Her remains are incorrupt and in the Spanish Civil War her tomb was desecrated though later restored.

Beatification
The beatification process commenced in an informative process that opened in 1729 and concluded sometime after having collected her writings and available witness interrogatories. Theologians met to discuss her theological writings and approved them as orthodox on 21 May 1760. An apostolic process was also held as a means of continuing the work of the previous process while the two were validated in Rome on 26 January 1803.

The formal introduction to the cause came on 16 September 1769 under Pope Clement XIV when she was proclaimed a Servant of God - the first official stage in the process of sanctification. She was proclaimed to be Venerable on 19 August 1838 after Pope Gregory XVI recognized her life of heroic virtue.

Two informative processes were held to investigate two miracles required for her beatification and received the validation of the Congregation of Rites following its conclusion. Two separate meetings saw approval to the miracle on 7 March 1884 and 13 January 1885 while C.O.R. officials made the final decision in favor of the miracles on 21 July 1885.

Pope Leo XIII approved the two miracles on 21 February 1886 and beatified her in Saint Peter's Basilica at 10:00 a.m. on 26 February 1888.

References

External links
Hagiography Circle
Saints SQPN

1625 births
1696 deaths
17th-century venerated Christians
17th-century Spanish people
Augustinian nuns
Beatifications by Pope Leo XIII
People from Valencia
Spanish beatified people
Venerated Catholics